The Fire This Time: A New Generation Speaks About Race is an essay and poetry collection edited by the American author Jesmyn Ward and published by Scribner in 2016. The title, The Fire This Time alludes to James Baldwin's seminal 1963 text, The Fire Next Time.

Publication history
The book was published by Scribner on August 2, 2016.

Content
The Fire This Time is an anthology of 18 writers contributing essays and poetry to three movements entitled "Legacy", "Reckoning", and "Jubilee". The writers include, Carol Anderson, Rachel Kaadzi Ghansah, Jericho Brown, Edwidge Danticat, Kevin Young, Claudia Rankine, Garnette Cadogan, Mitchell S. Jackson, Kima Jones, Kiese Laymon, Daniel Jose Older, Emily Raboteau, Clint Smith, Isabel Wilkerson, Natasha Trethewey, Wendy S. Walters, and Honorée Jeffers. 

Reviewing the collection for The New York Times, Jamil Smith described the anthology as, "deal[ing] with everything from the Charleston church shooting to OutKast’s influence to Rachel Dolezal’s chicanery, all through a black lens that is still too rare in literature and elsewhere. The pain of black life (and death) often inspires flowery verse, but every poem and essay in Ward’s volume remains grounded in a harsh reality that our nation, at large, refuses fully to confront. In the spirit of Baldwin’s centering of black experiences, they force everyone to see things our way."

Reception
Writing for the San Francisco Chronicle, Imani Perry described Ward's collection as, "a composition made by someone who is as careful a reader as she is a writer. Ward is attuned to the spirit of this moment and she is its conductor, gifting insight to us all." Dwight Garner particularly praised contributions by Ward, Rachel Kaadzi Ghansah, Carol Anderson, Kevin Young, and Garnette Cadogan, saying their works are "[e]ach...so alive with purpose, conviction and intellect that, upon finishing their contributions, you feel you must put this volume down and go walk around for a while."

References

2016 anthologies
American anthologies
American poetry anthologies
Essay anthologies
21st-century American literature
African-American literature
Literature by African-American women
Books about race and ethnicity
Charles Scribner's Sons books